The Gutin Mountains are a mountain range within the Vihorlat-Gutin Area of the Inner Eastern Carpathians. They are centered in Maramureș County in Romania, bordering Satu Mare County, and also stretching further towards northwest as the Oaș Mountains, and reaching the border with Zakarpattia Oblast in Ukraine.

See also

 Romanian Carpathians
 Ukrainian Carpathians

References

Sources

External links
 Gutin Mountains on the geographical map of Maramureș County
 Gutin and Oaș Mountains on the northern section map of Satu Mare County

Mountain ranges of the Eastern Carpathians
Mountain ranges of Romania
Mountain ranges of Ukraine